Dylan Francis Adjei-Hersey (born 6 September 2002) is an English professional footballer who plays as a winger for Hungerford Town on loan from AFC Wimbledon.

Career
Adjei-Hersey made his professional debut for Wimbledon as a last minute substitute in a 1-1 draw at Fleetwood Town on 23 April 2022. He then made his first professional start in the final game of the 2021–22 EFL League One season at home against Accrington Stanley, a 4-3 defeat that confirmed Wimbledon’s relegation.

The next season, Adjei-Hersey was on the bench twice, first against Gillingham on 30 July 2022  and then against Gillingham in the EFL Cup. 

In January 2023, Adjei-Hersey joined Hungerford Town on loan.

Career statistics

References

2002 births
Living people
Footballers from Carshalton
English footballers
Association football midfielders
AFC Wimbledon players
Merstham F.C. players
Eastbourne Borough F.C. players
Hungerford Town F.C. players
English Football League players
Isthmian League players
National League (English football) players